The Episcopal Diocese of Puerto Rico is a diocese of the Episcopal Church in Puerto Rico.

Under Spanish rule, Puerto Rico was part of a Roman Catholic-affiliated monarchical Spanish government for over 400 years. Towards the end of that period, in the late 1870s, the Spanish government in Puerto Rico, at the behest of the Anglican bishop of Antigua, allowed the construction of the first Protestant temple in Puerto Rico, the Anglican Holy Trinity church in Ponce, to serve the spiritual needs of British merchant marines serving the port of Ponce.  Severe restrictions were imposed on the church, such as not using its front door nor ringing the church bell which the British monarch, Queen Victoria provided each Anglican Church, so as to not attract local residents to the congregation.  The second Protestant temple in Puerto Rico was established by the Anglican church in the village of Isabel Segunda on the island of Vieques.

The United States military forces that disembarked in the Guánica sector that was then a part of the municipality of Yauco in July, 1898, during their long march to the capital city of San Juan, marched through Ponce and, while there, rang for the first time Holy Trinity's church bell, which since then has been known as the "Religious Freedom Bell", commemorating the fact that the First Amendment right to full religious freedom arrived in Puerto Rico in 1898.

Under United States rule, Protestantism flourished in Puerto Rico and the two Anglican congregations in Ponce and Vieques were transformed into the Episcopal Diocese of Puerto Rico with over 50 churches, three schools and multiple health facilities throughout two of the three inhabited islands of Puerto Rico.

Until 1987, Episcopalians in Puerto Rico were ruled by five successive Diocesan Bishops selected by the United States-based Episcopal Church, the last of which was a native-born Puerto Rican, the Rt. Rev. Francisco Reus-Froylan. In 1987, the diocese's Diocesan Assembly was allowed to elect retiring bishop Reus-Froylan's successor, resulting in the election of the Rt. Rev. David Alvarez as Puerto Rico's first elected Episcopal Bishop.

Under Bishop Reus-Froylan, the Episcopal Diocese of Puerto Rico separated from the Episcopal Church in the USA (ECUSA) in 1978 but was reinstated in 2002 under Bishop Alvarez, and it now forms part of Province IX.

In 2017 Bishop Rafael Morales succeeded bishop Wilfrido Ramos-Orench in 2017 who served as provisional bishop of the diocese after David Andres Alvarez-Velazquez retired on 31 October 2013. The Diocesan Assembly met on December 7 to elect the new Diocesan Bishop, among five candidates, including three from the Diocese of Puerto Rico, and one each from the Dioceses of the Republic of Colombia and the Commonwealth of Pennsylvania. On January 25, 2014, the appointment of Bishop Ramos as Provisional Bishop of Puerto Rico was ratified by the Diocesan Assembly.

Subsequently, on December 10, 2016, the Diocesan Assembly, after considering four candidates, including a female member of the clergy, elected the Rev. Canon Rafael Morales to serve as the VII Bishop of the Diocese of Puerto Rico.  Presiding Bishop Michael Curry as well as four other bishops, David Alvarez, Wilfrido Ramos-Orench, the then recently consecrated bishop of South Florida and a nephew of Bishop Reus-Froylan, the Rt. Rev. Peter Eaton, and the retiring bishop of the Dominican Republic consecrated Morales on July 22, 2017, at a service held at the Pedro Rosselló Convention Center in San Juan. The next day, in a service at the  Catedral de San Juan Bautista he was enthroned by Rev. Canon Dr. Mario H. Rodríguez.

The 80th General Convention of the Episcopal Church will consider and vote on whether the Diocese of Puerto Rico should move from Province IX to Province II. The Diocese of Puerto Rico has been in Province IX, which comprises seven Episcopal dioceses in Latin America and the Caribbean including Puerto Rico, Colombia, Dominican Republic, Central Ecuador, Litoral Ecuador, Honduras, and Venezuela, since Puerto Rico was readmitted to The Episcopal Church in 2003.  Province II of The Episcopal Church consists of the dioceses in the states of New York and New Jersey, Haiti, Cuba, the Virgin Islands and the Convocation of Episcopal Churches in Europe.

Bishops 
 James H. Van Buren, 1902-1913
 Charles B. Colmore, 1913-1947
 Charles F. Boynton, 1947-1951
 Albert Ervine Swift, 1951-1965
 Francisco Reus-Froylan, 1965-1989
 David Álvarez, 1989-2013 Wilfrido Ramos-Orench (Provisional Bishop) (2014-2017)
 Rafael Morales, 2017–present

References

External links

Iglesia Episcopal Puertorriqueña (Episcopal Diocese of Puerto Rico) official website (Spanish)

Anglican Church in the Caribbean
Anglicanism in Puerto Rico
Dioceses established in the 20th century
Puerto Rico
 
Province 9 of the Episcopal Church (United States)